Catalina Lercaro (Catherine Lercaro), 16th century, was an Italian-Canarian woman of the Lercaro family, renowned in the city of San Cristóbal de La Laguna (Tenerife, Canary Islands, Spain).

The Lercaro were an important family of Genoese merchants, based in Tenerife after the conquest. Catalina, daughter of Antonio Lercaro, was forced to marry an older man, who enjoyed a good position and great wealth. This marriage of convenience did not please Catalina, who on her wedding day decided to kill herself by leaping into the pit which is located in the courtyard of the family mansion (since 1993, the Museum of the History of Tenerife). 
The legend suggests that Catalina's body is buried in one of the rooms in the house, because, having committed suicide, the Catholic Church opposed a Christian burial in a consecrated cemetery. These events led the Lercaro family to move to La Orotava. Since then many people claim to have seen the specter of Catalina Lercaro walking through the halls of the museum.

Catalina Lercaro is the most famous ghost of the Canary Islands and it is one of the best known ghost stories in Spain. The mansion where she died is the most famous "haunted mansion" on the islands.

References 

People from San Cristóbal de La Laguna
European ghosts
16th-century Spanish women